Vera Georgievna Muratova (born 3 July 1980) is a Russian Paralympic powerlifter. She won the bronze medal in the women's 79 kg event at the 2020 Summer Paralympics held in Tokyo, Japan. A few months later, she won the silver medal in her event at the 2021 World Para Powerlifting Championships held in Tbilisi, Georgia.

Career

She finished in 4th place in the women's 67.5 kg event at the 2012 Summer Paralympics held in London, United Kingdom. She represented Russia at the 2012 Summer Paralympics and she competed at the 2020 Summer Paralympics under the flag of the Russian Paralympic Committee.

In 2014, she won the bronze medal in her event at the IPC Powerlifting World Championships held in Dubai, United Arab Emirates. At the 2019 World Para Powerlifting Championships held in Nur-Sultan, Kazakhstan, she won the bronze medal in the women's 86 kg event. In June 2021, she won the gold medal in her event with a new world record of 143 kg at the 2021 World Para Powerlifting World Cup event held in Dubai, United Arab Emirates.

Results

References

External links
 

Living people
1980 births
People from Samarkand
Female powerlifters
Paralympic powerlifters of Russia
Powerlifters at the 2012 Summer Paralympics
Powerlifters at the 2020 Summer Paralympics
Russian powerlifters
Medalists at the 2020 Summer Paralympics
Paralympic bronze medalists for the Russian Paralympic Committee athletes
Paralympic medalists in powerlifting